Spiraxis is a genus of predatory air-breathing land snails, terrestrial pulmonate gastropod mollusks in the family Spiraxidae.

Spiraxis is the type genus of family Spiraxidae.

Species 
Some species belonging to this genus are:

 Spiraxis nitidus pittieri Martens, 1898 
 Spiraxis paulisculpta Rehder, 1942
 Spiraxis scalella Martens, 1898

References 

Spiraxidae